Geocharidius is a genus of ground beetles in the family Carabidae. There are about 18 described species in Geocharidius.

Species
These 18 species belong to the genus Geocharidius:

 Geocharidius andersoni Sokolov & Kavanaugh, 2014
 Geocharidius antigua Sokolov & Kavanaugh, 2014
 Geocharidius balini Sokolov & Kavanaugh, 2014
 Geocharidius celaquensis Sokolov & Kavanaugh, 2014
 Geocharidius comayaguanus Sokolov & Kavanaugh, 2014
 Geocharidius disjunctus Sokolov & Kavanaugh, 2014
 Geocharidius erwini Sokolov & Kavanaugh, 2014
 Geocharidius gimlii Erwin, 1982
 Geocharidius integripennis (Bates, 1882)
 Geocharidius jalapensis Sokolov & Kavanaugh, 2014
 Geocharidius lencanus Sokolov & Kavanaugh, 2014
 Geocharidius longinoi Sokolov & Kavanaugh, 2014
 Geocharidius minimus Sokolov & Kavanaugh, 2014
 Geocharidius phineus Erwin, 1982
 Geocharidius romeoi Erwin, 1982
 Geocharidius tagliantii Erwin, 1982
 Geocharidius vignatagliantii Sokolov & Kavanaugh, 2014
 Geocharidius zullinii Vigna Taglianti, 1973

References

Trechinae